The Lumpy Money Project/Object is  a compilation album by Frank Zappa. Released posthumously on January 23, 2009 as Official Release #85, it compiles the releases Lumpy Gravy and We're Only in It for the Money with previously unreleased material, with the overall package serving as an audio documentary of the production of the two albums, which share conceptual continuity themes. It is project/object #2 in a series of 40th Anniversary FZ Audio Documentaries, following MOFO (2006).

Content 

The first disc consists of the 1967 version of Lumpy Gravy, intended for release by Capitol Records (actually a few 4-track cartridge copies of the Capitol version were distributed to wholesalers and radio stations before MGM Records, Zappa's label at the time, forced Capitol to halt distribution of their version of the album), and the 1968 mono mix of We're Only in It for the Money. The second disc consists of two remixes prepared by Zappa in 1984, with overdubs by drummer Chad Wackerman and bassist Arthur Barrow. The Lumpy Gravy remix derives from the 1968 edit; this third version of the album had not been released in full; an excerpt appeared in a sampler for The Old Masters box set. The second remix, of We're Only in It for the Money had previously been released on compact disc in 1986. The third disc consists of studio assembly material and interviews with Zappa discussing the albums, as well as the single version of "Lonely Little Girl".

Track listing

Credits
All Music produced/composed & performed/conducted by Frank Zappa. 
The Lumpy Money Project/Object Compiled & Produced by Gail Zappa & Joe Travers 
Liner notes: David Fricke 
Conceptual & Continuous Stuff & Text: Gail Zappa 
Production Manager: Melanie Starks 
Solar Dominance: Jupiter 
Cover Art, Package Design & Layout: Michael Mesker 
FZ Portrait Photo: Linda McCartney 
Mastering & Audio Restoration engineer, Discs One and Three: John Polito
Mastering, Disc Two: Bernie Grundman

References 

Frank Zappa compilation albums
2009 compilation albums
Zappa Records albums
Compilation albums published posthumously